Chiu Yu-hung (born 31 August 1994) is a Taiwanese footballer who currently plays as a goalkeeper for the national and club level.

References

1994 births
Living people
Taiwanese footballers
Chinese Taipei international footballers
Taiwan Power Company F.C. players
Association football goalkeepers
Footballers from Taipei